Michele Gismondi (11 June 1931 in Montegranaro – 5 September 2013) was an Italian professional road cyclist.

Major results

1952
 3rd Trofeo Baracchi (with Fausto Coppi)
1953
 1st Gran Premio Industria Belmonte Piceno
 1st Stage 11 Giro d'Italia (TTT)
 2nd Giro del Lazio
 4th Road race, World Road Championships
1954
 2nd Giro di Campania
 3rd Giro dell'Emilia
 3rd Gran Premio Industria Belmonte Piceno
 4th Road race, World Road Championships
1955
 1st Stages 4 & 5 Roma-Napoli-Roma
1957
 1st Stage 4 Roma-Napoli-Roma
 2nd Giro di Campania
1959
 1st Coppa Agostoni
 2nd Road race, World Road Championships
 2nd Trofeo Baracchi (with Diego Ronchini)
 2nd Coppa Bernocchi
 2nd Trofeo Boldini
 3rd GP Faema

Results on the major tours

Tour de France
1959: 30th

Giro d'Italia
1953: 38th
1954: 20th
1955: 13th
1958: 66th
1959: 16th
1960: 24th

References

1931 births
2013 deaths
Italian male cyclists
Sportspeople from the Province of Fermo
Cyclists from Marche